Gaspard Aurele Mare Baumgarten (born 3 August 1992) is a French field hockey player.

Baumgarten is sponsored by Ritual Hockey.

Club career
Baumgarten joined Léopold in the Men's Belgian Hockey League in 2018. Before that he played his whole career for Lyon except for the 2014–15 season when he played for Atlètic Terrassa in Spain.

International career

Under–21
Gaspard Baumgarten debuted for the France U–21 team in 2012 at the EuroHockey Junior Championship in 's-Hertogenbosch.

The following year he went on to represent the team at the FIH Junior World Cup in New Delhi. At the tournament he won a silver medal, a history making performance for the French team.

Senior national team
Baumgarten made his debut for the French national team in 2012.

In 2018, he was represented his country at the FIH World Cup in Bhubaneswar.

Since his debut, Baumgarten has been a regular fixture in the national squad. He won his first major medal with the senior team in 2019 at the FIH Series Finals in Le Touquet, taking home a gold medal.

He was a member of the national team at the 2021 EuroHockey Championships in Amsterdam, and was also named in the French squad for the 2021–22 FIH Pro League.

References

External links

1992 births
Living people
French male field hockey players
Male field hockey forwards
2018 Men's Hockey World Cup players
Place of birth missing (living people)
Royal Léopold Club players
Men's Belgian Hockey League players
Atlètic Terrassa players
División de Honor de Hockey Hierba players
2023 Men's FIH Hockey World Cup players